Paul John Buckmaster (13 June 1946 – 7 November 2017) was a Grammy Award-winning British cellist, arranger, conductor and composer, with a career spanning five decades.

He is best known for his orchestral collaborations with David Bowie, Shawn Phillips, Elton John, Harry Nilsson, The Rolling Stones, Carly Simon, Leonard Cohen, Miles Davis, and the Grateful Dead in the 1970s, followed by his contributions to the recordings of many other artists, including Stevie Nicks, Lionel Richie, Celine Dion, Carrie Underwood, Kenny Rogers, Guns N’ Roses, Taylor Swift, Something Corporate, Train,  and Heart.

Early life
Paul Buckmaster was born in London on 13 June 1946. His father, John Caravoglia Buckmaster, was an English actor and his mother, Ermenegilda ("Gilda") Maltese, was an Italian concert pianist and graduate of the Naples Conservatory of Music.

At age four, Buckmaster started attending a small private school in London called the London Violoncello School, and continued studying cello under several private teachers until he was ten. In 1957, his mother took him and his two siblings to Naples, where he auditioned with cello professor Willy La Volpe, to be assessed as eligible for a scholarship. From 1958 to 1962 he divided his time between studying music in Naples and working for his GCEs in London, then won a scholarship to study the cello at the Royal Academy of Music, from which he graduated with a performance diploma in 1967.

Career

Studio work
Buckmaster displayed professional mastery as a cellist. After leading a small orchestral group during a two-month tour with the Bee Gees in 1968, he started his career as an orchestral arranger on various hit songs, including David Bowie's "Space Oddity" (1969),
and contributed orchestral collaborations on a number of early albums by Elton John (1969–72), as well as on the songs "Sway" and "Moonlight Mile" on The Rolling Stones' album Sticky Fingers (1971). Buckmaster contributed string and horn arrangements to Leonard Cohen's 1971 album, Songs of Love and Hate. He also helped Miles Davis with the preparation of On the Corner (1972) and wrote the arrangements for the studio sessions, in which he also participated, at Davis' request, by humming bass lines and rhythms to lead the musicians. These arrangements were often used as a starting point to be transformed until what was being played bore no resemblance to what he had written. This was in keeping with the Stockhausian approach that Buckmaster and Davis had discussed in the weeks leading up to the session.

Film work
Buckmaster wrote some instrumental tracks for Harry Nilsson's film Son of Dracula (1974). He also played with Bowie and his band in the recordings for the original soundtrack to the science fiction film The Man Who Fell to Earth (1976), in which Bowie starred as Thomas Jerome Newton. Buckmaster stated in Mojo magazine's feature "60 Years of Bowie", that he had played cello on the original soundtrack recordings, on which Carlos Alomar, J. Peter Robinson and others were also included:

Later, the film's director Nicolas Roeg decided not to use the recordings but rather existing songs as the soundtrack for the movie.

In 1995 Buckmaster composed, orchestrated, conducted and produced the original score to Terry Gilliam's 12 Monkeys. He also composed the score for the 1997 film Most Wanted.

Personal life
Buckmaster's siblings are Rosemary and Adrian. He married Diana Lewis in 1970, divorced three years later. From a relationship with Rosalie Van Leer, they had a son Banten. Buckmaster died on 7 November 2017 in Los Angeles.

Awards
Buckmaster won the 2002 Grammy Award for Best Instrumental Arrangement Accompanying Vocalist(s) for Drops of Jupiter.

Selected discography

Explanatory footnotes

References

External links
 Dueblin, Christian (13 September 2009) Interview with Paul Buckmaster, Xecutives.net

 Paul Buckmaster: In His Own Words at eltonjohn.com
 Paul Buckmaster at The Music Aficionado
Paul Buckmaster Official website

1946 births
2017 deaths
Alumni of the Royal Academy of Music
English cellists
English classical composers
English male classical composers
English people of Italian descent
Grammy Award winners
British music arrangers
English film score composers
English male film score composers
English classical cellists
English conductors (music)
British male conductors (music)